The Salvador Primera División de Fútbol Profesional Apertura 2004 season (officially "Torneo Apertura 2004") started on August 7, 2004.

The season was composed of the following clubs:

 C.D. FAS
 Municipal Limeño
 San Salvador F.C.
 C.D. Águila
 C.D. Luis Ángel Firpo
 A.D. Isidro Metapán
 C.D. Atlético Balboa
 Alianza F.C.
 Once Lobos
 Once Municipal

Team information

Personnel and sponsoring

Managerial changes

Before the season

During the season

Apertura 2004 standings
Last updated August 2, 2004

4th place playoff

Playoffs

Semifinals 1st Leg

Semifinals 2nd Leg

Final

Top scorers

List of foreign players in the league
This is a list of foreign players in Apertura 2004. The following players:
have played at least one apetura game for the respective club.
have not been capped for the El Salvador national football team on any level, independently from the birthplace

C.D. Águila
  Arnold Cruz
   Dario Larrosa
   Fábio Pereira de Azevedo 
  Jimmy Vargas (Djimi Vargas)
  Marcelo Gonzales

Alianza F.C.
  Martin Garcia
  Ariel Fontela
  Yari Silvera
  Alejandro Curbelo
  Luis Fernando Espindola 

Atletico Balboa
  Juan Carlos Mosquera
  Luis Carlos Asprilla
  Ernesto Noel Aquino
  Franklin Webster
  Eugenio Valerio

C.D. FAS
  Victor Hugo Mafla
  Williams Reyes
  Alejandro Bentos 
  Marcelo Messías
  Nicolás Muñoz 

C.D. Luis Ángel Firpo
  Óscar Abreu Mejía
  Mauro Cajú 
  Manuel Abreu
  Sebastian Rudman
  Juan Pablo Chacon

 (player released mid season)
  (player Injured mid season)
 Injury replacement player

A.D. Isidro Metapán
  Juan Carlos Reyes
  Juan Bicca
  Alcides Bandera
  Andrés Bazzano
  Johnny Descolines

Municipal Limeno
  Francis Reyes
  Marcos Adrian Sum
  Álvaro Méndez
  Marcelo Marquez dos Santos
  Leonardo Sum

Once Lobos
  Claudio Pasadi
  Anderson Batista
  Libardo Carvajal
  Pablo Quinones
  Nito Gonzales

Once Municipal
  Miguel Solís
  Alessandro De Oliveira 
  Victor Jaramillo
  Wilmer Ramos
  Patricio Gallardo

San Salvador F.C.
  Alexander Obregón
  Carlos Escalante
  Gustavo Cabrera
  Paulo Cesar Rodriguez
  Fernando Fajardo Balzani

External links
 

Primera División de Fútbol Profesional Apertura seasons
El
1